In geometry, the great ditrigonal dodecacronic hexecontahedron (or great lanceal trisicosahedron) is a nonconvex isohedral polyhedron. It is the dual of the uniform great ditrigonal dodecicosidodecahedron. Its faces are kites. Part of each kite lies inside the solid, hence is invisible in solid models.

Proportions 
Its dihedral angles equal . The ratio between the lengths of the long edges and the short ones equals .

References
 p. 62

External links 
 

Dual uniform polyhedra